Aoupinieta obesa is a species of moth of the family Tortricidae. It is found in New Caledonia in the south-west Pacific Ocean.

The wingspan is about 38 mm. The ground colour of the forewings is rust-brown with indistinct brown strigulae (fine streaks) and brown markings. The hindwings are cream, tinged with pale orange at the apex.

Etymology
The species name refers to the broad elements of the female genitalia and the size of the species and is derived from Latin obesa (meaning obese).

References

Moths described in 2013
Archipini
Taxa named by Józef Razowski